Sleeping Car is a 1933 British romantic comedy film directed by Anatole Litvak and starring Madeleine Carroll, Ivor Novello and Laddie Cliff.

It was made at the Lime Grove Studios in London. The film's art direction was by Alfred Junge.

Plot
A young French sleeping car attendant working on the trans-European Orient Express has a string of lovers at the various stations along the line. However his world is transformed when he meets a young British aristocrat, who he asks out for a date in Vienna but has to abandon because of a lack of funds. Angry with him she returns to Paris, while he is fired for taking time off without permission. However, discovering that due to various driving offences her stay in France will be cut short unless she marries a French citizen, she decides to marry him.

Cast
 Madeleine Carroll as Anne
 Ivor Novello as Gaston
 Kay Hammond as Simone
 Claud Allister as Baron Delande
 Laddie Cliff as Pierre
 Stanley Holloway as Francois
 Ivor Barnard as Durande
 Vera Bryer as Jenny

References

Bibliography
 Low, Rachael. Filmmaking in 1930s Britain. George Allen & Unwin, 1985.
 Wood, Linda. British Films, 1927-1939. British Film Institute, 1986.

External links
 

1933 romantic comedy films
1933 films
1930s English-language films
Films directed by Anatole Litvak
British romantic comedy films
British black-and-white films
Films shot at Lime Grove Studios
Films set in Paris
Films set in Vienna
Rail transport films
Gainsborough Pictures films
Films with screenplays by Franz Schulz
1930s British films